O Outro is a Brazilian telenovela produced and broadcast by TV Globo. It premiered on 23 March 1987 and ended on 10 October 1987, with a total of 173 episodes. It's the thirty seventh "novela das oito" to be aired on the timeslot. It is created by Aguinaldo Silva and directed by Fred Confalonieri.

Cast

References

External links 
 

1987 telenovelas
Brazilian telenovelas
1987 Brazilian television series debuts
1987 Brazilian television series endings
TV Globo telenovelas
Portuguese-language telenovelas